The State Journal-Register is the only local daily newspaper for Springfield, Illinois, and its surrounding area. It was founded in 1831 as the Sangamo Journal by William Bailhache and Edward Baker, and describes itself as "the oldest newspaper in Illinois". As such, it and its editor, Edward L. Baker, supported the political career of the Springfield-based Abraham Lincoln in the years before the American Civil War; in fact, it was in the Journals office that Lincoln and his friends waited for the telegraphic news from Chicago to find out who would be the Republican presidential nominee in 1860. Later in publication, the name was changed to Illinois State Journal. The cover-price is $2 daily, $4.50 on Sunday.

Copley Press bought the State Journal in 1927. In 1942, it bought Springfield's afternoon paper, the Illinois State Register. For years, the two papers maintained separate editorial stances, with the State Journal tilting Republican and the State Register tilting Democratic. The two papers merged on July 1, 1974 as The State Journal-Register.

Fairport, New York-based GateHouse Media bought The State Journal-Register, along with most of Copley's other Midwestern titles, in 2007. In November 2019, GateHouse was merged with Gannett, forming the largest newspaper chain in the U.S.

Since the change in ownership, the paper has downsized its staff, leading to internal controversy and at least one editor resigning in protest. In 2022, the paper announced it would stop printing its Saturday edition.

References

External links
The State Journal-Register website
Illinois Digital Newspaper Collections: Sangamo Journal/Illinois State Journal (1831–1853)

Gannett publications
Newspapers published in Illinois
Springfield, Illinois
Companies based in Sangamon County, Illinois
Publications established in 1831